The 2018 Cincinnati Reds season was the 149th season for the franchise in Major League Baseball, and their 16th at Great American Ball Park in Cincinnati.

Offseason

Transactions

Standings

National League Central

National League Wildcard

Record vs. opponents

Regular Season Summary

Opening Day starting lineup

April
April 19: The Reds fired manager Bryan Price after a 3–15 start to the season, along with pitching coach Mack Jenkins. Price managed in Cincinnati for five seasons and finished with a record of 279 wins and 387 losses. Bench coach Jim Riggleman was named interim manager, with Double-A Pensacola pitching coach Danny Darwin joining the coaching staff. Pat Kelly, who was the manager of Triple-A Louisville, will be the bench coach.
April 23 – April 29: Joey Votto was named N.L. Player of the Week as he slashed .360/.543/.880 with 7 runs scored, 4 HR and 8 RBI, while drawing 9 walks.

May
May 7 – May 13: Scooter Gennett was named N.L. Player of the Week with a slash line of .591/.591/1.227, 4 HR, 10 RBI, 7 runs and 2 doubles.
May 8: The Reds acquired starting pitcher Matt Harvey from the New York Mets in exchange for catcher Devin Mesoraco.
May 10 – May 13: The Reds swept the Dodgers in a four-game series for the first time since August 1976.
May 21 – May 27: Scooter Gennett was named N.L. Player of the Week for the second time in the 2018 season. Gennett batted .500 (12–for-24) with 6 runs scored, 2 doubles, 3 HR and 10 RBI over six games played. Among his NL counterparts during the period, Scooter finished first in hits, slugging percentage (.958) and total bases (23); tied for first in home runs, extra–base hits (5) and RBI; second in batting average; tied for third in runs scored; and seventh in on–base percentage (.519).

June
June 2: Scooter Gennett was named N.L. Player of the Month for the month of May. Gennett batted .398 (37–for–93) with 16 runs scored, 6 doubles, 8 HR and 24 RBI over 26 games played.
June 21–24: The Reds swept the Cubs in a four-game series for the first time since April 1983, outscoring them 31–13 in the four games. In game 3, Anthony DeSclafani hit a grand slam, the first pitcher to do this for the Reds since Bob Purkey in 1959. In the 4th game, the Reds trailed 6–1, but managed to come back by scoring 7 runs in the 7th inning.
June 30: Michael Lorenzen became the second Reds pitcher to hit a grand slam this season following Anthony DeSclafani's grand slam a week earlier. The home run was Lorenzen's third in as many at-bats making him the first pitcher to homer in three-straight at-bats since Mike Hampton in 2001.

July
July 8: Joey Votto, Scooter Gennett and Eugenio Suárez were named reserves on the National League squad for the 2018 MLB All-Star Game in Washington, D.C. This is Votto's sixth All-Star selection and the first for both Gennett and Suarez.
July 10: The Reds rallied from a four run deficit and scored seven runs in the 9th inning to defeat the Cleveland Indians, 7–4. The four-run comeback was the Reds' first since June 30, 2006 when Adam Dunn hit a walk-off grand slam, also against the Indians.
July 17: Scooter Gennett and Joey Votto both hit home runs in a 6–8 loss to the American League in the All-Star game. Gennett's home run was the first for a Red in an All-Star game since July 13, 1982 when Dave Concepción hit one.
July 23: The Reds were no-hit for seven innings by Cardinals rookie pitcher Daniel Poncedeleon. Poncedelon was taken out of the game in the 8th inning where Phillip Ervin broke up the no-hitter with a single off reliever Jordan Hicks. Eugenio Suárez tied the game in the 9th with a solo home run and Dilson Herrera hit a walk-off single later in the inning to give the Reds the 2–1 win.
July 30: The Reds acquired pitchers Lucas Sims and Matt Wisler along with outfielder Preston Tucker from the Atlanta Braves in exchange for outfielder Adam Duvall.

August
August 10: Joey Votto collected his 1,700th career hit with a single in the sixth-inning. Votto is the ninth player in franchise history to reach that level.
August 29: Eugenio Suárez hit his 30th home run of the season, becoming the fourth player in Reds history to hit that many home runs while primarily playing third base. He joins Tony Pérez, Todd Frazier and Deron Johnson. Pitcher Michael Lorenzen also had a pinch-hit three-run home run, his fourth home run and his third against the Brewers this season.

September
September 8: Scott Schebler hit the 10th grand slam by a Reds player this season, setting a club record. 
September 9: Joey Votto hit his second grand slam and the 11th overall for the Reds this season, one shy of the N.L. record. The 1997 Braves and 2000 Cardinals share the N.L. record of 12. Nine different Reds players have hit grand slams this season, Scott Schebler, Adam Duvall (2), Scooter Gennett, Eugenio Suárez, Joey Votto (2), Jesse Winker, starting pitcher Anthony DeSclafani, reliever Michael Lorenzen, and José Peraza. According to STATS, the Reds are only the second team to have nine different players hit a grand slam in a season, the 2000 Cardinals had 10 players connect on a grand slam.
September 12: Scooter Gennett went 1–4 to bring his season average against the Dodgers to .654 with 17 hits, 2 HR and 10 RBI.

Game log 

|-style="background: #bbb"
|—||March 29|| Nationals ||colspan="8"|Postponed (rain) (Makeup date: March 30) 
|-style="background:#ffbbbb
|1||March 30|| Nationals || 0–2 || Scherzer (1–0) || Bailey (0–1) || Doolittle (1) || 43,878 || 0–1 ||L1
|-style="background:#ffbbbb
|2||March 31|| Nationals || 7–13 || Strasburg (1–0) || Castillo (0–1) || — || 27,341 || 0–2 ||L2
|-style="background:#ffbbbb
|3||April 1|| Nationals || 5–6 || González (1–0) || Romano (0–1) || Doolittle (2) || 10,335 || 0–3 ||L3
|-style="background:#ccffcc
|4||April 2|| Cubs || 1–0 || Mahle (1–0) || Chatwood (0–1) || Iglesias (1) || 18,963 || 1–3 || W1
|-style="background:#bbb
|—||April 3|| Cubs ||colspan="8"|Postponed (rain) (Makeup date: May 19) 
|-style="background:#ffbbbb
|5||April 5|| @ Pirates || 2–5 || Brault (2–0) || Bailey (0–2) || Rivero (3) || 9,227 || 1–4  || L1
|-style="background:#ffbbbb
|6||April 6|| @ Pirates || 3–14 || Williams (2–0)  || Castillo (0–2) || — || 11,115 || 1–5 || L2  
|-style="background:#ccffcc
|7||April 7|| @ Pirates || 7–4 || Peralta (1–0) || Kontos (0–1) || Iglesias (2) || 14,336 || 2–5 ||  W1
|-style="background:#ffbbbb
|8||April 8|| @ Pirates || 0–5 || Taillon (2–0) || Mahle (1–1) || — || 11,261 || 2–6 || L1
|-style="background:#ffbbbb
|9||April 9|| @ Phillies || 5–6 || García (1–1) || Quackenbush (0–1) || Neris (1)  || 18,127 || 2–7 || L2
|-style="background:#ffbbbb
|10||April 10|| @ Phillies || 1–6 || Nola (1–0) || Hughes (0–1) || — || 20,895 || 2–8 || L3
|-style="background:#ffbbbb
|11||April 11|| @ Phillies || 3–4 (12) || Ríos (1–0)  || Brice (0–1) || — || 19,099  || 2–9 ||  L4
|-style="background:#ffbbbb
|12||April 12|| Cardinals || 4–13 || Wacha (2–1) || Brice (0–2) || Mayers (1) || 11,128 || 2–10 || L5
|-style="background:#ffbbbb
|13||April 13|| Cardinals || 3–5 || Weaver (2–0) || Mahle (1–2) || Norris (2) || 19,561 || 2–11 || L6
|-style="background:#ffbbbb
|14||April 14|| Cardinals || 1–6 || Mikolas (2–0)  || Finnegan (0–1) || — || 19,213 || 2–12 || L7
|-style="background:#ffbbbb
|15||April 15|| Cardinals || 2–3|| Martinez (2–1) || Bailey (0–3)|| Norris (3) || 15,557 || 2–13 || L8
|-style="background:#ccffcc
|16||April 16|| @ Brewers || 10–4 || Castillo (1–2) || Suter (1–2) ||— || 28,677 || 3–13 || W1
|-style="background:#ffbbbb
|17||April 17|| @ Brewers || 0–2 || Jennings (2–0) || Romano (0–2) || Hader (2) || 31,345 || 3–14 || L1
|-style="background:#ffbbbb
|18||April 18|| @ Brewers || 0–2 || Davies (1–2) || Mahle (1–3) || Barnes (2) || 37,343  || 3–15 || L2
|-style="background:#ffbbbb
|19||April 20|| @ Cardinals || 2–4 || Wacha (3–1) || Finnegan (0–2) || Norris (5) || 43,303 || 3–16 || L3 
|-style="background:#ffbbbb
|20||April 21|| @ Cardinals || 3–4 || Hicks (1–0) || Hughes (0–2) || — || 42,382 || 3–17 ||  L4
|-style="background:#ffbbbb
|21||April 22|| @ Cardinals || 2–9 || Mikolas (3–0) || Castillo (1–3) || — || 44,430 || 3–18 || L5
|-style="background:#ccffcc
|22||April 23|| Braves || 10–4 || Romano (1–2) || Freeman (0–1) || Iglesias (3) || 9,463 || 4–18 || W1
|-style="background:#ccffcc
|23||April 24|| Braves || 9–7 (12) || Hughes (1–2)|| Fried (0–1) || — || 14,139 || 5–18 || W2
|-style="background:#ffbbbb
|24||April 25|| Braves || 3–4 || Winkler (1–0) || Shackelford (0–1) || Minter (1) || 13,113 || 5–19 || L1
|-style="background:#ffbbbb
|25||April 26|| Braves || 4–7 || Freeman (1–1) || Peralta (1–1) || Vizcaíno (2) || 11,919  || 5–20 || L2
|-style="background:#ccffcc
|26||April 27|| @ Twins || 15–9 || Hernandez (1–0) || Duffey (0–1) || — || 25,002 || 6–20 || W1
|-style="background:#ffbbbb
|27||April 28|| @ Twins || 1–3 || Odorizzi (2–2) || Romano (1–3) || Rodney (3) || 27,115 || 6–21 || L1
|-style="background:#ccffcc
|28||April 29|| @ Twins || 8–2 || Mahle (2–3) || Berríos (2–3) || — || 25,677 || 7–21 || W1
|-style="background:#ffbbbb
|29||April 30|| Brewers || 5–6 || Woodruff (1–0) || Peralta (1–2) || Hader (4) || 9,536 || 7–22 || L1
|-

|-style="background:#ffbbbb
|30||May 1|| Brewers || 6–7 || Anderson (3–2) || Bailey (0–4) || Jeffress (1) || 12,933 || 7–23 || L2
|-style="background:#ffbbbb
|31||May 2|| Brewers || 1–3 || Miley (1–0) || Castillo (1–4) || Jeffress (2) || 10,346 || 7–24 || L3
|-style="background:#ccffcc
|32||May 4|| Marlins || 4–1 || Romano (2–3) || Chen (1–1) || Iglesias (4) || 22,610 || 8–24 || W1
|-style="background:#ffbbbb
|33||May 5|| Marlins || 0–6 || Smith (2–3) || Mahle (2–4) ||—|| 19,609 || 8–25 || L1
|-style="background:#ffbbbb
|34||May 6|| Marlins || 5–8 || Straily (1–0) || Finnegan (0–3) || Ziegler (4) || 19,800 || 8–26 || L2
|-style="background:#ffbbbb
|35||May 7|| Mets || 6–7 || Gsellman (4–0) || Bailey (0–5) || Familia (10) || 15,187 || 8–27 || L3
|-style="background:#ccffcc
|36||May 8|| Mets || 7–2 || Castillo (2–4) || Vargas (0–3) || — || 14,804 || 9–27 || W1
|-style="background:#ccffcc
|37||May 9|| Mets || 2–1 (10) || Iglesias (1–0) || Ramos (1–2) || — || 16,452 || 10–27 || W2
|-style="background:#ccffcc
|38||May 10|| @ Dodgers || 4–1 || Mahle (3–4) || Buehler (2–1) ||  Iglesias (5) || 47,383 || 11–27 || W3
|-style="background:#ccffcc
|39||May 11|| @ Dodgers || 6–2 || Brice (1–2) || Maeda (2–3) || Iglesias (6) || 46,979 || 12–27 || W4
|-style="background:#ccffcc
|40||May 12|| @ Dodgers || 5–3 || Bailey (1–5) || Chargois (1–1) || Hughes (1) || 49,911 || 13–27 || W5
|-style="background:#ccffcc
|41||May 13|| @ Dodgers || 5–3 || Castillo (3–4) || Hill (1–2) || Iglesias (7) || 44,787 || 14–27 || W6
|-style="background:#ffbbbb
|42||May 14|| @ Giants || 7–10 || Stratton (4–3) || Romano (2–4) ||  || 36,156 || 14–28 || L1
|-style="background:#ffbbbb
|43||May 15|| @ Giants || 3–5 || Johnson (2–1) || Mahle (3–5) || Strickland (9) || 37,809 || 14–29 || L2
|-style="background:#ccffcc
|44||May 16|| @ Giants || 6–3 || Hughes (2–2) || Suarez (1–3) ||  Iglesias (8)|| 38,662 || 15–29 || W1
|-style="background:#ffbbbb
|45||May 18|| Cubs || 1–8 || Lester (4–1) || Bailey (1–6) || — || 22,060|| 15–30 || L1
|-style="background:#ccffcc
|46||May 19 (1)|| Cubs || 5–4 (11) || Floro (1–0) || Wilson (1–1) || — || 19,046 || 16–30 || W1
|-style="background:#ffbbbb
|47||May 19 (2)|| Cubs || 0–10 || Quintana (5–3)  || Romano (2–5) || — || 26,082 || 16–31 || L1
|-style="background:#ffbbbb
|48||May 20|| Cubs || 1–6 || Darvish (1–3) || Mahle (3–6) || — || 26,988 || 16–32 || L2
|-style="background:#ccffcc
|49||May 22|| Pirates || 7–2 || Harvey (1–2) || Taillon (2–4) || — || 16,144 || 17–32 || W1
|-style="background:#ffbbbb
|50||May 23|| Pirates || 4–5 (12) || Brault (4–1) || Floro (1–1) || Crick (1) || 18,659 || 17–33 || L1
|-style="background:#ccffcc
|51||May 24|| Pirates || 5–4 || Castillo (4–4) || Nova (2–5) || Hughes (2) || 14,853 || 18–33 || W1
|-style="background:#ffbbbb
|52||May 25|| @ Rockies || 4–5 || Gray (5–6) || Romano (2–6) || Davis (18) || 33,193 || 18–34 || L1
|-style="background:#ccffcc
|53||May 26|| @ Rockies || 6–5 || Lorenzen (1–0) || Rusin (0–1) || Hughes (3) || 42,844 || 19–34 || W1
|-style="background:#ffbbbb
|54||May 27|| @ Rockies || 2–8 || Marquez (4–5) || Harvey (1–3) || — || 36,387 || 19–35 || L1
|-style="background:#ffbbbb
|55||May 28|| @ Diamondbacks || 5–12 || Koch (3–3) || Bailey (1–7) || — || 29,924 || 19–36 || L2
|-style="background:#ffbbbb
|56||May 29|| @ Diamondbacks || 2–5 || Godley (5–4) || Castillo (4–5) || Boxberger (13) || 20,046 || 19–37 || L3
|-style="background:#ccffcc
|57||May 30|| @ Diamondbacks || 7–4 || Romano (3–6) || Corbin (5–2) || Iglesias (9) || 18,340 || 20–37 || W1
|-

|-style="background:#ccffcc
|58||June 1|| @ Padres || 7–2 || Mahle (4–6) || Lockett (0–1) || Lorenzen (1) || 25,729 || 21–37 || W2
|-style="background:#ffbbbb
|59||June 2|| @ Padres || 2–8 || Lauer (2–3) || Harvey (1–4) || — || 31,710 || 21–38 || L1
|-style="background:#ffbbbb
|60||June 3|| @ Padres || 3–6 || Ross (5–3) || Castillo (4–6) || Yates (1) || 25,377 || 21–39 || L2
|-style="background:#ffbbbb
|61||June 5|| Rockies || 6–9 || Freeland (6–5) || DeSclafani (0–1) || Davis (19) || 21,944 || 21–40 || L3
|-style="background:#ffbbbb
|62||June 6|| Rockies || 3–6 || Gray (6–6) || Romano (3–7) || Davis (20) || 19,762 || 21–41 || L4
|-style="background:#ccffcc
|63||June 7|| Rockies || 7–5 (13) || Floro (2–1) || Rusin (0–2) || — || 15,957 || 22–41 || W1 
|-style="background:#ffbbbb
|64||June 8|| Cardinals || 6–7 (10) || Norris (3–1) || Iglesias (1–1) || Brebbia (2) || 26,144 || 22–42 || L1
|-style="background:#ffbbbb
|65||June 9|| Cardinals || 4–6 || Wacha (8–1) || Castillo (4–7) || Hicks (1) || 34,469 || 22–43 || L2
|-style="background:#ccffcc
|66||June 10|| Cardinals || 6–3 || DeSclafani (1–1) || Martinez (3–3) || Hughes (4) || 19,344 || 23–43 || W1
|-style="background:#ccffcc
|67||June 12|| @ Royals || 5–1 (10) || Hernandez (2–0) || McCarthy (4–3) || — || 20,476 || 24–43 || W2
|-style="background:#ccffcc
|68||June 13|| @ Royals || 7–0 || Mahle (5–6) || Hammel (2–7) || — || 24,899 || 25–43 || W3 
|-style="background:#ffbbbb
|69||June 15|| @ Pirates || 2–3 || Kuhl (5–4) || Harvey (1–5) || Vázquez (13) || 23,007 || 25–44 || L1
|-style="background:#ffbbbb
|70||June 16|| @ Pirates || 2–6 || Nova (4–5) || Castillo (4–8)|| — || 27,479 || 25–45 || L2
|-style="background:#ccffcc
|71||June 17|| @ Pirates || 8–6 || DeSclafani (2–1) || Musgrove (2–2) || Iglesias (10) || 23,042 || 26–45 || W1
|-style="background:#ccffcc
|72||June 19|| Tigers || 9–5 || Romano (4–7) || Boyd (4–5) || — || 31,085 || 27–45 || W2
|-style="background:#ccffcc
|73||June 20|| Tigers || 5–3 || Mahle (6–6) || Fulmer (3–6) || Iglesias (11) || 19,177 || 28–45 || W3
|-style="background:#ccffcc
|74||June 21|| Cubs || 6–2 || Harvey (2–5) || Hendricks (5–7) || Hughes (5) || 19,581 || 29–45 || W4
|-style="background:#ccffcc
|75||June 22|| Cubs || 6–3 || Castillo (5–8) || Quintana (6–6) || Iglesias (12) || 25,885 || 30–45|| W5
|-style="background:#ccffcc
|76||June 23|| Cubs || 11–2 || DeSclafani (3–1) || Farrell (2–3) || — || 36,818 || 31–45 || W6
|-style="background:#ccffcc
|77||June 24|| Cubs || 8–6 || Stephens (1–0) || Strop (3–1) || Iglesias (13) || 30,508 || 32–45 || W7
|-style="background:#ffbbbb
|78||June 25|| @ Braves || 4–5 (11) || Jackson (1–0) || Floro (2–2) || — || 27,851 || 32–46 || L1
|-style="background:#ccffcc
|79||June 26|| @ Braves || 5–3 || Harvey (3–5) || Sánchez (3–2) || Iglesias (14) || 28,356 || 33–46 || W1
|-style="background:#ccffcc
|80||June 27|| @ Braves || 6–5 || Stephens (2–0) || Freeman (2–4) || Iglesias (15) || 30,207 || 34–46 || W2
|-style="background:#ffbbbb
|81||June 28|| Brewers || 4–6 || Guerra (4–5) || Garrett (0–1) || Knebel (8) || 20,347 || 34–47 || L1
|-style="background:#ffbbbb
|82||June 29|| Brewers || 2–8 || Anderson (6–6) || Romano (4–8) || — || 26,130 || 34–48 || L2
|-style="background:#ccffcc
|83||June 30|| Brewers || 12–3 || Hernandez (3–0) || Zagurski (0–1) || — || 24,640 || 35–48 || W1
|-

|-style="background:#ccffcc
|84||July 1|| Brewers || 8–2 || Harvey (4–5) || Peralta (1–3) || — || 18,483 || 36–48 || W2
|-style="background:#ccffcc
|85||July 2|| White Sox || 5–3 || Floro (3–2) || Volstad (1–5) || Iglesias (16) || 16,727 || 37–48 || W3 
|-style="background:#ffbbbb
|86||July 3|| White Sox || 8–12 (12) || Santiago (3–3) || Stephens (2–1) || — || 22,742 || 37–49 || L1
|-style="background:#ccffcc
|87||July 4|| White Sox || 7–4 || Romano (5–8) || Covey (3–4) || Hughes (6) || 24,442 || 38–49 || W1
|-style="background:#ccffcc
|88||July 6|| @ Cubs || 3–2 || Mahle (7–6) || Montgomery (3–3) || Iglesias (17) || 41,434 || 39–49 || W2
|-style="background:#ffbbbb
|89||July 7|| @ Cubs || 7–8 || Rosario (4–0) || Hughes (2–3)|| Morrow (20) || 41,538 || 39–50 || L1
|-style="background:#ffbbbb
|90||July 8|| @ Cubs || 5–6 (10)|| Farrell (3–3) || Stephens (2–2) || — || 38,655  || 39–51 || L2
|-style="background:#ccffcc
|91||July 9|| @ Indians || 7–5 || DeSclafani (4–1) || Clevinger (7–4) || Iglesias (18) || 22,561 || 40–51 || W1
|-style="background:#ccffcc
|92||July 10|| @ Indians || 7–4 || Crockett (1–0) || Allen (2–4) || Iglesias (19) || 21,908 || 41–51 || W2
|-style="background:#ffbbbb
|93||July 11|| @ Indians || 4–19 || Carrasco (10–5) || Mahle (7–7) || Plutko (1) || 22,215 || 41–52 || L1
|-style="background:#ccffcc
|94||July 13|| @ Cardinals || 9–1 || Harvey (5–5) || Martinez (6–5) || — || 45,891 || 42–52 || W1
|-style="background:#ccffcc
|95||July 14|| @ Cardinals || 8–2 || Brice (2–2) || Hicks (3–2) || — || 44,668 || 43–52 || W2
|-style="background:#ffbbbb
|96||July 15|| @ Cardinals || 4–6 || Gant (3–3) || DeSclafani (4–2) || Hicks (2) || 45,808 || 43–53 || L1
|- style="text-align:center; background:#bbcaff;"
| colspan="12" | 2018 Major League Baseball All-Star Game: Washington, DC at Nationals Park|-style="background:#ffbbbb
|97||July 20|| Pirates || 1–12 || Taillon (7–7) || Mahle (7–8)|| — || 20,726 || 43–54 || L2
|-style="background:#ffbbbb
|98||July 21|| Pirates || 2–6 || Kingham (5–4) || DeSclafani (4–3) || — || 23,244 || 43–55 || L3
|-style="background:#ffbbbb
|99||July 22|| Pirates || 2–9 || Nova (6–6) || Harvey (5–6)  || — || 23,615 || 43–56 || L4
|-style="background:#ccffcc
|100||July 23|| Cardinals || 2–1 || Hughes (3–3) || Norris (3–3) || — || 17,518 || 44–56 || W1
|-style="background:#ffbbbb
|101||July 24|| Cardinals || 2–4 (11)|| Tuivailala(3–3) || Garrett (0–2) || Norris (19) || 18,379 || 44–57 || L1
|-style="background:#ccffcc
|102||July 25|| Cardinals || 7–3 || Romano (6–8) || Flaherty (4–5) || — || 20,940 || 45–57 || W1
|-style="background:#ffbbbb
|103||July 26|| Phillies || 4–9 || Suárez (1–0) || Lorenzen (1–1) || — || 17,031 || 45–58 || L1 
|-style="background:#ccffcc
|104||July 27|| Phillies || 6–4 || Hernandez (4–0) || Pivetta (6–9) || Iglesias (20) || 24,776 || 46–58 ||W1 
|-style="background:#ccffcc
|105||July 28|| Phillies || 6–2 || Peralta (2–2) || Hunter (2–1) || Hughes (7) || 35,249 || 47–58 || W2
|-style="background:#ccffcc
|106||July 29|| Phillies || 4–0 || Castillo (6–8) || Eflin (7–3) || Iglesias (21) || 21,649 || 48–58 || W3
|-style="background:#ffbbbb
|107||July 31|| @ Tigers || 1–2 || Boyd (6–9) || Bailey (1–8) || Greene (22) || 24,929 || 48–59 || L1
|-

|-style="background:#ffbbbb
|108||August 1|| @ Tigers || 4–7 || VerHagen (2–2) || Romano (6–9) || Greene (23) || 24,952 || 48–60 || L2
|-style="background:#ffbbbb
|109||August 2|| @ Nationals || 4–10 || Scherzer (15–5) || Mahle (7–9) || — || 28,845 || 48–61 || L3
|-style="background:#bbb
|—||August 3|| @ Nationals ||colspan="8"|Postponed (rain) (Makeup date: August 4)  
|-style="background:#ccffcc
|110||August 4 (1)|| @ Nationals || 7–1 || DeSclafani (5–3) || González (6–8) || — || 32,687 || 49–61 || W1
|-style="background:#ffbbbb
|111||August 4 (2)|| @ Nationals || 2–6|| Hellickson (5–2) || Harvey (5–7) || — || 36,149 || 49–62 || L1
|-style="background:#ffbbbb
|112||August 5|| @ Nationals || 1–2 || Roark (6–12) || Castillo (6–9) || Herrera (17) || 33,486 || 49–63 || L2
|-style="background:#ffbbbb
|113||August 6|| @ Mets ||4–6 || Syndergaard (7–2) || Bailey (1–9) || Blevins (1) || 21,644 || 49–64 || L3
|-style="background:#ccffcc
|114||August 7|| @ Mets || 6–1 || Romano (7–9) || Vargas (2–8) || — || 22,207 || 50–64 || W1
|-style="background:#ffbbbb
|115||August 8|| @ Mets || 0–8 || deGrom (6–7) || Stephenson (0–1) || — || 24,287 || 50–65 || L1
|-style="background:#ccffcc
|116||August 10|| Diamondbacks || 3–0 || DeSclafani (6–3) || Buchholz (5–2) || Iglesias (22) || 19,089 || 51–65 || W1
|-style="background:#ccffcc
|117||August 11|| Diamondbacks || 6–3 || Garrett (1–2) || Bradley (3–4) || Iglesias (23) || 29,348 || 52–65 || W2
|-style="background:#ffbbbb
|118||August 12|| Diamondbacks || 2–9 || Godley (13–6) || Castillo (6–10) || — || 17,909 || 52–66 || L1
|-style="background:#ffbbbb
|119||August 13|| Indians || 3–10 || Clevenger (8–7) || Bailey (1–10) || — || 20,607 || 52–67 || L2
|-style="background:#ffbbbb
|120||August 14|| Indians || 1–8 || Kluber (15–6) || Romano (7–10) || — || 19,034 || 52–68 || L3
|-style="background:#ffbbbb
|121||August 15|| Indians || 3–4 || Otero (2–1) || Reed (0–1) || Hand (28) || 17,275 || 52–69 || L4
|-style="background:#ccffcc
|122||August 17|| Giants || 2–1 (11) || Hernandez (5–0) || Black (2–2) || — || 19,540 || 53–69 || W1
|-style="background:#ccffcc
|123||August 18|| Giants || 7–1 || Harvey (6–7) || Bumgarner (4–5) || – || 23,878 || 54–69 || W2
|-style="background:#ccffcc
|124||August 19|| Giants || 11–4 || Castillo (7–10) || Suarez (4–9) || – || 22,756 || 55–69 || W3
|-style="background:#ffbbbb
|125||August 20|| @ Brewers || 2–5 || Anderson (8–7) || Bailey (1–11) || Jeffress (5) || 27,590 || 55–70 || L1
|-style="background:#ccffcc
|126||August 21|| @ Brewers || 9–7 || Iglesias (2–1) || Jennings (4–5) || — || 29,467 || 56–70 || W1
|-style="background:#ffbbbb
|127||August 22|| @ Brewers || 0–4 || Peralta (6–4) || Stephenson (0–2) || Jeffress (6) || 33,058 || 56–71 || L1
|-style="background:#ffbbbb
|128||August 23|| @ Cubs || 1–7 || Hamels (9–9) || DeSclafani (6–4) || — || 41,130 || 56–72 || L2
|-style="background:#ffbbbb
|129||August 24|| @ Cubs || 2–3 (10) || Chavez (4–2) || Iglesias (2–2) || — || 37,760 || 56–73 || L3
|-style="background:#ffbbbb
|130||August 25|| @ Cubs || 6–10 || Quintana (11–9) || Castillo (7–11) || — || 41,205 || 56–74 || L4 
|-style="background:#ffbbbb
|131||August 26|| @ Cubs || 0–9 || Hendricks (10–10) || Bailey (1–12) || — || 40,331 || 56–75 || L5
|-style="background:#ccffcc
|132||August 28|| Brewers  || 9–7 || DeSclafani (7–4) || Guerra (6–9) || Iglesias (24) || 13,242 || 57–75 || W1
|-style="background:#ffbbbb
|133||August 29|| Brewers || 12–13 (10)|| Jeffress (7–1) || Iglesias (2–3) || — || 11,777 || 57–76 || L1
|-style="background:#ffbbbb
|134|| August 30 || Brewers || 1–2 || Soria (1–0) || Brice (2–3) || Hader (11) || 13,403 || 57–77 || L2
|-style="background:#ffbbbb
|135||August 31|| @ Cardinals || 5–12 || Gomber (5–0) || Bailey (1–13) || — || 42,365 || 57–78 || L3
|-

|-style="background:#ccffcc
|136||September 1|| @ Cardinals || 4–0 || Castillo (8–11) || Poncedeleon (0–1) || — || 46,368 || 58–78 || W1
|-style="background:#ccffcc
|137||September 2|| @ Cardinals || 6–4 (10) || Lorenzen (2–1) || Norris (3–4) || Iglesias (25) || 45,743 || 59–78 || W2
|-style="background:#ffbbbb
|138||September 3|| @ Pirates || 1–5 || Williams (12–9) || Harvey (6–8) ||—|| 13,843 || 59–79 || L1
|-style="background:#ffbbbb
|139||September 4|| @ Pirates || 3–7 || Musgrove (6–8) || Reed (0–2) || — || 8,855 || 59–80 || L2
|-style="background:#ffbbbb
|140||September 5|| @ Pirates || 2–3 || Taillon (12–9) || Bailey (1–14) || Vázquez (30)|| 9,560 || 59–81 || L3
|-style="background:#ffbbbb
|141||September 6|| Padres || 2–6 || J. Castillo (2–2) || L. Castillo (8–12) || — || 14,303 || 59–82 || L4
|-style="background:#ccffcc
|142||September 7|| Padres || 12–6 || Lorenzen (3–1) || Strahm (3–4) || — || 14,854 || 60–82 || W1
|-style="background:#ccffcc
|143||September 8|| Padres || 7–2 (7)|| Harvey (7–8) || Erlin (3–6) || — || 20,977 || 61–82 || W2
|-style="background:#ffbbbb
|144||September 9|| Padres || 6–7 || Stammen (7–2) || Iglesias (2–4) || Yates (7) || 18,424 || 61–83 || L1 
|-style="background:#ccffcc
|145||September 10|| Dodgers || 10–6 ||  Hughes (4–3) || Wood (8–7) || — || 12,161 || 62–83 || W1
|-style="background:#ccffcc
|146||September 11|| Dodgers || 3–1 || Castillo (9–12) || Ryu (4–3) || Iglesias (26) || 14,964 || 63–83 || W2
|-style="background:#ffbbbb
|147||September 12|| Dodgers || 1–8 || Ferguson (6–2) || DeSclafani (7–5) || – || 15,633 ||  63–84 || L1
|-style="background:#ffbbbb
|148||September 14|| @ Cubs || 2–3 || Maples (1–0) || Hernandez (5–1) || De La Rosa (1) || 36,468 || 63–85 || L2
|-style="background:#ffbbbb
|149||September 15|| @ Cubs || 0–1 || Lester (16–6) || Romano (7–11) || Cishek (4) || 41,196 || 63–86 || L3
|-style="background:#ccffcc
|150||September 16|| @ Cubs || 2–1 || Castillo (10–12) || Quintana (13–10) || Iglesias (27) || 41,314 || 64–86 || W1
|-style="background:#ffbbbb
|151||September 17|| @ Brewers || 0–8 || Miley (5–2) || DeSclafani (7–6) || Woodruff (1) || 32,145 || 64–87 || L1
|-style="background:#ccffcc
|152||September 18|| @ Brewers || 3–1 || Romano (8–11) || Anderson (9–8) || Iglesias (28) || 30,366 || 65–87 || W1
|-style="background:#ffbbbb
|153||September 19|| @ Brewers || 0–7 || González (9–11) || Harvey (7–9) || — || 33,443 || 65–88 || L1
|-style="background:#ccffcc
|154||September 20|| @ Marlins || 4–2 || Reed (1–2) || Brigham (0–3) || Iglesias (29) || 9,863 || 66–88 || W1
|-style="background:#ffbbbb
|155||September 21|| @ Marlins || 0–1 (10) || Barraclough (1–6) || Hernandez (5–2) || — || 11,471 || 66–89 || L1
|-style="background:#ffbbbb
|156||September 22|| @ Marlins || 1–5 || Ureña (8–12) || DeSclafani (7–7) || Steckenrider (5) || 12,559 || 66–90 || L2
|-style="background:#ffbbbb
|157||September 23|| @ Marlins || 0–6 || Richards (4–9) || Lorenzen (3–2) || — || 13,595 || 66–91 || L3
|-style="background:#ffbbbb
|158||September 25|| Royals || 3–4 || McCarthy (5–4) || Iglesias (2–5) || Peralta (14) || 13,172 || 66–92 || L4
|-style="background:#ffbbbb
|159||September 26|| Royals || 1–6 || Fillmyer (4–2) || Reed (1–3) || — || 12,549 || 66–93 || L5
|-style="background:#ffbbbb
|160||September 28|| Pirates || 4–8 || Brault (6–3) || DeSclafani (7–8) || — || 19,689 || 66–94 || L6
|-style="background:#ccffcc
|161||September 29|| Pirates || 3–0 || Lorenzen (4–2) || Taillon (14–10) || Iglesias (30) || 42,630 || 67–94 || W1 
|-style="background:#ffbbbb
|162||September 30|| Pirates || 5–6 (10)|| Feliz (1–2) || Stephens''' (2–3)|| Vázquez (37) || 25,091 || 67–95 || L1
|-

|- style="text-align:center;"
| Legend:       = Win       = Loss       = PostponementBold = Reds team member

Roster

Farm system

References

External links
 Official Website 
2018 Cincinnati Reds season at Baseball Reference

2018
2018 Major League Baseball season
2018 in sports in Ohio